The male name Kirilo is a first name commonly used among Serbs and other South Slavs, mainly in Serbia, Montenegro and Bosnia and Herzegovina. In origin, it is a Greek name. In various languages, distinctive forms of the same name are also used, like: Kiril (Kirill), Cyril (Cyrill), Cyryl (Polish), Kiryl (Belarusian), Kyril, Kyrill, Kyrylo (Ukrainian) and a diminutive Kiro (common in the Southeastern Europe).

People with the name
Kirilo I, Serbian Patriarh (1407-1419)
Kirilo II, Serbian Patriarch (1759-1763)
Kirilo Mitrović, Serbian bishop (1908-1931)

See also
Kiril
Kirill
Kyril
Cyril
Cirillo

Masculine given names
Serbian masculine given names